Raba Khan is an Australian born Bangladeshi comedian, YouTuber, model, singer, and author. She is known for her satirical commentary on everyday life in Bangladesh. She is a radio jockey at ABC Radio. In 2020, Raba was featured in Forbes' 30 Under 30 Asia list in the Media, Marketing & Advertising category. She is a UNICEF Youth Ambassador and has worked to advocate for children's rights.

Biography

Early life and family 
Raba Khan was born in a Muslim family on 11 May 1998 in Sydney, Australia. Her father is a businessman, and her mother is a homemaker. She has a brother named Fahad Reaz Khan who is a director. She moved to Dhaka, Bangladesh with her family when she was 16 years old.

Career 
Raba Khan started her career as a YouTuber in June 2014 at the age of 15 by posting her debut video “Bengali Couples React to Break-Ups (With Classic Songs)”. She became known for her personal vlogs and videos about Bengali life on her YouTube channel, TheJhakanakaProject. Some of her videos are satirical, addressing social issues and stereotypes in Bangladesh, others includ Khan singing or lip-syncing, or reenacting old TV commercials. She has also collaborated with other YouTubers like SalmoN TheBrownFish and BhaiBrothers LTD. In 2022, she released a studio album in collaboration with Arafat Mohsin. The album is titled Muhurto. 

In 2018, she beacme a Youth Ambassador to advocate for children’s rights by UNICEF. She is a goodwill ambassador for ActionAid. She's been a speaker at Harvard University webinars. She has also worked with the World Food Program.

She owns a fashon line named JKNK.

বান্ধobi 
Besides YouTube and modeling, Raba Khan also writes books. Her debut book named Bandhobi (styled as বান্ধobi, Bangladeshi slang for “girlfriend”), was published in 2019. The book chronicles the lives of nine young women in Dhaka, in the form of a teenager's anecdotes. The book is written in a causal and laxed use of the Bangla language.

References

1998 births
Living people
Bangladeshi comedians
Bangladeshi YouTubers